Oebares II (Old Persian: Vaubara) was, according to Herodotus (Herodotus 6.33) a son of Megabazus, himself a first degree cousin of Darius I. Oebares became satrap of Daskyleion (Hellespontine Phrygia) in 493 BC, after his father.

Herodotus mentions Oebares, when writing about the retaliatory actions of the Achaemenid fleet following the Ionian revolt:

Megabates was a brother of Oebares. He was a commander of the Achaemenid fleet that sailed against Naxos in 500/499 BC. He also was Satrap of Daskyleion in the early 470s.

In 479 BC, Artabazos was named the new satrap of Hellespontine Phrygia. He was the first official satrap of the Pharnacid dynasty, named after his illustrious father Pharnaces. This office was passed down to his descendants, down to the conquests of Alexander the Great.

References

Military leaders of the Achaemenid Empire
5th-century BC Iranian people
Satraps of the Achaemenid Empire
Family of Darius the Great